Lidia is a feminine given name. It is the Greek, Italian, Polish, Romanian, and Spanish transcription of the name Lydia.

People
Notable people with the name include:
Lidia Alexeyeva (1924–2014), Russian basketball coach
Lidia Argondizzo (born 1960), Australian politician
Lidia Bastianich (born 1947), American chef, author, television presenter and restaurateur
Lidia Bobrova (born 1952), Russian film director
Lidia Borda (born 1966), Argentinian tango singer
Lidia Chmielnicka (1939–2002), Polish volleyball player
Lidia Chojecka (born 1977), Polish middle distance runner
Lidia Elsa Satragno (1935–2022), Argentine entertainer and politician 
Lidia Falcón (born 1935), Spanish politician and writer
Lidia Geringer de Oedenberg (born 1957), Polish politician and Member of the European Parlement
Lidia Gueiler Tejada (1921–2011), the first female President of Bolivia
Lidia Grychtołówna (born 1928), Polish pianist
Lidia Ivanova (1936–2007), Russian print and television journalist, television announcer and writer
Lídia Jorge (born 1946), prominent Portuguese writer
Lidia Klement (1937–1964), Soviet singer
Lidia Kopania (born 1978), Polish singer (Kind of Blue)
Lidia Menapace (1924–2020), Italian resistance fighter and politician
Lidia Poët (1855–1949), the first modern female Italian advocate
Lidia Quaranta (1891-1928), Italian actress
Lidia Ravera, Italian writer, journalist, essayist and screenwriter
Lidia Rudnicka (born 1960); Polish-American researcher and dermatologist
Lidia Ruslanova (1900–1973), Russian folk singer
Lidia Semenova (born 1951), Ukrainian chess Woman Grandmaster
Lidia Șimon (born 1973), Romanian long-distance runner
Lidia Staroń (born 1960), Polish politician
Lidia Talpă (born 1982), Romanian sprint canoeist
Lidia Trettel (born 1973), Italian snowboarder and Olympic medalist
Lidia Valentín (born 1985), Spanish weightlifter
Lidia Wysocka (1916–2006), Polish actress
Lidia Yusupova (born 1961), the Coordinator of the law office of the Moscow-based human rights organization Memorial
Lidia Zamenhof (1904–42), Polish writer, publicist, translator and the youngest daughter of Ludwik Zamenhof, the creator of the international language Esperanto
Lidia Zamkow (1918–1982), Polish theatre actress and director

Other
 Tropical Storm Lidia caused widespread damage in Mexico in 1981
 Hurricane Lidia in 1987, which weakened over water and caused only rainfall in California
 Hurricane Lidia in 1993, with landfall in Mexico
 Tropical Storm Lidia in 2005 (no landfall)
 Tropical Storm Lidia (2017), which damaged Mexico's Baja California Sur in 2017
 Lidia Sobieska, the fictional Prime Minister of Poland in Tekken 7, a fighting game in Bandai Namco's Tekken franchise.

See also
Lidiya
Lydia

References

Greek feminine given names
Italian feminine given names
Polish feminine given names
Romanian feminine given names
Spanish feminine given names